Spilomyia boschmai is a species of Hoverfly in the family Syrphidae.

Distribution
Italy.

References

Eristalinae
Insects described in 1964
Diptera of Europe